The 2013 Erste Bank Open was a men's tennis tournament played on indoor hard courts. It was the 39th edition of the event known that year as the Erste Bank Open, and part of the ATP World Tour 250 Series of the 2013 ATP World Tour. It was held at the Wiener Stadthalle in Vienna, Austria, from 14 October through 20 October 2013. Second-seeded Tommy Haas  won the singles title.

Singles main-draw entrants

Seeds

 Rankings are as of October 7, 2013

Other entrants
The following players received wildcards into the singles main draw:
  Martin Fischer 
  Gerald Melzer 
  Dominic Thiem

The following players received entry from the qualifying draw:
  Mirza Bašić 
  Ruben Bemelmans 
  Ilija Bozoljac 
  Miloslav Mečíř Jr.

The following player received entry as lucky loser:
  Jaroslav Pospíšil

Withdrawals
Before the tournament
  Roberto Bautista Agut
  Victor Hănescu
  Marinko Matosevic
  Jürgen Melzer (shoulder injury)
  Grega Žemlja

Doubles main-draw entrants

Seeds

 Rankings are as of October 7, 2013

Other entrants
The following pairs received wildcards into the doubles main draw:
  Andreas Haider-Maurer  /  Gerald Melzer 
  Maximilian Neuchrist  /  Dominic Thiem

Withdrawals
Before the tournament
  Jürgen Melzer (shoulder injury)

Finals

Singles

 Tommy Haas defeated  Robin Haase, 6–3, 4–6, 6–4

Doubles

 Florin Mergea /  Lukáš Rosol defeated  Julian Knowle /  Daniel Nestor, 7–5, 6–4

References

External links
 
 ATP tournament profile

Erste Bank Open
Vienna Open
Erste Bank Open